The 1979 Torneo Descentralizado, the top category of Peruvian football (soccer), was played by 16 teams. The national champion was Sporting Cristal.

The season was divided into 2 stages. On the first stage, top 8 teams qualified to play for the championship with a points bonus of 3, 2 and 1 for the top 3; bottom eight qualified to play for relegation with a points penalty of -1, -2 and -3 for bottom three. Teams entered the second stage without carrying their whole season records. As three teams tied on points the last place of Relegation Group they had to enter a Relegation Playoff that was played in Lima.

Teams

Results

First stage

Final group

Relegation group

Relegation play-off

External links 
 RSSSF Peru 1979

Peru
1
Peruvian Primera División seasons